CORE Music Foundation began as C.O.R.E., a network of united hip hop artists working together to obtain success in the music industry, educating artists, promoting creative endeavors, and preserving the true essence of hip-hop culture.

Overview
The acronym C.O.R.E. stands for Chicago's Organization of Rap (hip-hop) Entertainment. It now stands as a cooperative organization of (conscious) Rap (hip-hop) Entertainers, with membership extending to the suburbs. C.O.R.E. and CORE Music Foundation was founded by Yakira Levi (also known as Yakira James. The CORE concept was conceived in 1994. In 1996, the network formed a student chapter sponsored by Columbia College Chicago.

On January 21, 2005, CORE Music Foundation was incorporated as a  not-for-profit corporation in the State of Illinois. The mission of CORE Music Foundation is to provide educational programming in the arts, mainly music and literacy. CMF provides outlets for creative expression, social interaction, and entertainment. CORE Music Foundation NFP is a public charity, exempt from federal income tax under section 501(c)(3) of the Internal Revenue Code.

CORE Music Foundation currently facilitates workshops and residencies at schools, libraries, parks, temples of worship, and other public places.

Geographically, CORE Music Foundation has directed most of its efforts in the Englewood and Austin areas of Chicago. CMF has developed close working relationships with Chicago Public Schools as a vendor, Illinois Arts Council as an Arts in Education program facilitator, and with the Center for Community Arts Partnerships (CCAP) at Columbia College Chicago for programming and teaching the arts at various community schools.

CORE Music Foundation has joined forces with Chicago Public Schools-Service Learning Program to provide high-school students with the opportunity to earn community service credit hours as required for graduation. CMF has also serviced the community at large by providing summer jobs to teens and adults, and by preparing and distributing free meals to hungry children and homeless adults.

See also
 hip hop

External links
 https://web.archive.org/web/20161220111615/http://www.joincore.org/home.html
 https://web.archive.org/web/20160224004235/http://coremusicfoundation.org/CORE_Music_Foundation/Welcome.html

References

Hip hop activists
Artist groups and collectives based in Chicago
Non-profit organizations based in Chicago